WIUP-FM (90.1 FM) is the student-run radio station of Indiana University of Pennsylvania in Indiana, Pennsylvania, United States. The station is currently owned by Indiana University of Pennsylvania and is run by the faculty and students of the university.

History

In 1968, IUP applied for a construction permit to build a new radio station at 91.3 MHz, broadcasting with 1,600 watts. The new station was initially slated to broadcast from the Learning Research Center, at that time under construction. WIUP-FM signed on October 9, 1969, from its Davis Hall studios.

WIUP-FM relocated to 90.1 MHz in 1980. The frequency change was a requirement of a facility upgrade for WYEP-FM in Pittsburgh, which at the same time was approved move from 91.5 to 91.3 and increased its effective radiated power.

Programming

IUP students from across the campus host and produce shows, plan and execute promotional events, and manage social media accounts. Student managers supervise and train other students and coordinate the program schedule. The station's eclectic format includes a wide selection of musical genres including jazz, rock, pop, urban and classical. The station is supervised by a faculty member from the IUP Department of Communications Media.

References

External links

WIUP page at iup.edu

IUP-FM
Indiana County, Pennsylvania
IUP-FM
Radio stations established in 1969